New North Church may refer to:
 New North Church, Boston
 New North Church, Edinburgh
 West St Giles' Parish Church: known as the New North Church between the 18th and mid-19th centuries
 New North Free Church: known as the New North Church between 1929 and its closure in 1941

See also
 New North (disambiguation)